The 2013-14 season was Club Social y Deportivo Colo-Colo's 83rd season in the Chilean Primera División. This article shows player statistics and all official matches that the club played during the 2013–14 season, which covers the period from 1 July 2013 to 30 June 2014.

Competitions

Torneo Apertura

League table

Results summary

Result round by round

Matches

Torneo Clausura

League table

Results summary

Result round by round

Matches

Copa Chile

Group stage

Knockout stage

Copa Sudamericana

First round

Second round

Squad

Coaching staff

Winter Transfers

In

Out

References

Colo-Colo seasons
Colo-Colo